Vrbice is a municipality and village in Karlovy Vary District in the Karlovy Vary Region of the Czech Republic. It has about 200 inhabitants.

Administrative parts
Villages of Bošov and Skřipová are administrative parts of Vrbice.

References

Villages in Karlovy Vary District